Hajji Mahmud (also Romanized as Ḩājjī Maḩmūd) is a village in Yurchi-ye Sharqi Rural District, Kuraim District, Nir County, Ardabil Province, Iran. At the 2006 census, its population was 187 from 38 families.

References 

Tageo

See also

Hajji Mahmud Shams

Towns and villages in Nir County